The 1990 Minnesota Golden Gophers football team represented the University of Minnesota in the 1990 NCAA Division I-A football season. In their fifth year under head coach John Gutekunst, the Golden Gophers compiled a 6–5 record and were outscored by their opponents by a combined total of 281 to 224.

Center Chris Thome was named All-Big Ten first team.  Offensive tackle Mike Sunvold and defensive back Sean Lumpkin were named All-Big Ten second team.  Punter Brent Herbel was named Academic All-American.  Quarterback Scott Schaffner and linebacker Joel Staats were named Academic All-Big Ten.

Mike Sunvold was awarded the Bronko Nagurski Award and Carl Eller Award.  Quarterback Marquel Fleetwood was awarded the Bruce Smith Award.  Cornerback Kenneth Sebree was awarded the Bobby Bell Award.  Cornerback Frank Jackson was awarded the Butch Nash Award.  Running back Jim King was awarded the Paul Giel Award.

Total attendance for the season was 243,511, which averaged out to 40,585 per game. The season high for attendance was against the Iowa.

Schedule

References

Minnesota
Minnesota Golden Gophers football seasons
Minnesota Golden Gophers football